Basketball Bundesliga-Pokal, commonly known as the BBL-Pokal, is the annual national basketball cup competition in Germany. Since 2009, the title has been awarded to the winner of a tournament competition between top clubs of each Basketball Bundesliga (BBL) season.

History and format

The competition was founded in 1966, by the German Basketball Federation. The first final of the German Basketball Cup took place on 11 June 1967, in Oberhausen. Since 1993, the cup championship is decided in a final four format, which is held over one weekend. The host team of the cup's final four, is automatically set as one of the participants. The three remaining teams are determined by three quarterfinal matches, played between the winners of the earlier round matches.

Starting from the 2018–19 season, the format was changed to a sixteen team knock-out tournament, with the sixteen highest seeded teams from the previous season qualifying.

Winners

 1966–67 Vfl Osnabrück (1)
 1967–68 Bayern Munich (1)
 1968–69 Gießen 46ers (1)
 1969–70 TuS 04 Leverkusen (1)
 1970–71 TuS 04 Leverkusen (2)
 1971–72 (Wolfenbüttel (1)
 1972–73 Gießen 46ers (2)
 1973–74 TuS 04 Leverkusen (3)
 1974–75 SSV Hagen
 1975–76 TuS 04 Leverkusen (4)
 1976–77 USC Heidelberg (1)
 1977–78 USC Heidelberg (2)
 1978–79 Gießen 46ers (3)
 1979–80 Saturn Köln (1)
 1980–81 Saturn Köln (2) 
 1981–82 Wolfenbüttel (2)
 1982–83 Saturn Köln (3) 
 1983–84 ASC 1846 Göttingen (1)
 1984–85 ASC 1846 Göttingen (2)
 1985–86 Bayer 04 Leverkusen (5)
 1986–87 Bayer 04 Leverkusen (6)
 1987–88 Steiner Bảyeuth (1)
 1988–89 Steiner Bảyeuth (2)
 1989–90 Bayer 04 Leverkusen (7) 
 1990–91 Bayer 04 Leverkusen (8)
 1991–92 TTL Bamberg (1)
 1992–93 Bayer 04 Leverkusen (9)
 1993–94 Brandt Hagen (1)
 1994–95 Bayer 04 Leverkusen (10)
 1995–96 ratiopharm Ulm
 1996–97 Alba Berlin (1)
 1997–98 TBB Trier (1)
 1998–99 Alba Berlin (2)
 1999–00 Skyliners Frankfurt (1)
 2000–01 TBB Trier (2)
 2001–02 Alba Berlin (3)
 2002–03 Alba Berlin (4)
 2003–04 RheinEnergie Köln (1)
 2004–05 RheinEnergie Köln (2)
 2005–06 Alba Berlin (5)
 2006–07 RheinEnergie Köln (3)
 2007–08 Artland Dragons (1)
 2008–09 Alba Berlin (6)
 2009–10 Brose Baskets (2)
 2010–11 Brose Baskets (3)
 2011–12 Brose Baskets (4)
 2012–13 Alba Berlin (7)
 2013–14 Alba Berlin (8)
 2014–15 EWE Baskets Oldenburg
 2015–16 Alba Berlin (9)
 2016–17 Brose Bamberg (5)
 2017–18 Bayern Munich (2)
 2018–19 Brose Bamberg (6)
 2019–20 Alba Berlin (10)
 2020–21 Bayern Munich (3)
 2021–22 Alba Berlin (11)
 2022–23 Bayern Munich (4)

Finals

Top Four Era (1993–2019, 2021–present)
From 1993 to 2019, a final four tournament was held in a host city to determine the winner of the BBL-Pokal.

Knockout tournament (2020)
In 2020 on, a knockout tournament was held to determine the winner of the BBL-Pokal.

Performance by club (since 1993)

References

External links
Basketball Bundesliga 
History of BBL 

 
Cup
Basketball cup competitions in Europe
German Cup
1966 establishments in Germany